Chisel Peak is the descriptive name for a remote   chisel-shaped mountain summit located above the south shore of Fortress Lake in Hamber Provincial Park in the Canadian Rockies of British Columbia, Canada. Its nearest higher peak is Ghost Mountain,  to the southwest.


Geology
Chisel Peak is composed of sedimentary rock laid down during the Precambrian to Cambrian periods and pushed east and over the top of younger rock during the Laramide orogeny.

Climate
Based on the Köppen climate classification, Chisel Peak is located in a subarctic climate with cold, snowy winters, and mild summers.

See also

Geology of the Rocky Mountains
 List of mountains in the Canadian Rockies

References

Notes

External links
 Weather: Chisel Peak

Three-thousanders of British Columbia
Canadian Rockies
Kootenay Land District